Bunny Ball is a teenage-girl character in humor comic books published by Harvey Comics. She was created by a separate company as a projected doll toy, with Harvey Comics having the comic-book license. The comic was originally written by Warren Harvey, a son of one of the company's founders, and featured artwork by illustrator Hy Eisman. Other artists who worked on the series included Sol Brodsky and Howard Post. 

The Bunny series initially ran 20 issues (cover-dated Dec. 1966–Dec. 1971), with a final, 21st issue published five years later (Nov. 1976). Bunny also appeared in Harvey Pop Comics #2 (Nov. 1969).

Bunny is an international model and actress. She has a younger sister named Honey and a rival named Esmeralda, or Esmy.  Other characters include The Beagles, an English rock group fronted by Bunny's love interest Frederick, the poet William Wordsworth, the painter Marc, the Soular System, a foursome similar to the Motown groups of the 1960s, and Felix, a motorcycle cop on whom Esmy has a crush. 

In November 1999, it was announced MGM had set Jennifer Love Hewitt to headline a feature film based on the character. Hewitt was to play a young woman who simultaneously attends college and goes on far-flung James Bond-esque spy missions. Stephen Sommers was in talks to direct.

References

External links 
Bunny entry at ComicVine
 Archive of McQuarrie, Jim, "Oddball Comics" (column), #1154, April 29, 2007

1966 comics debuts
American comic strips
Comics characters introduced in 1966
Fictional actors
Fictional models
Harvey Comics series and characters